Mesmerized is an EP by Seirom, released on February 1, 2015 by Ksenza Records.

Track listing

Personnel
Adapted from the Mesmerized liner notes.
 Maurice de Jong (as Mories) – vocals, instruments, recording, cover art

Release history

References

External links 
 Mesmerized at Discogs (list of releases)
 Mesmerized at Bandcamp

2015 EPs
Seirom albums